Something on the Inside is the seventh overall album of gospel singer Vanessa Bell Armstrong, and fourth for major label Jive Records. The title track was released as a single. Something On The Inside also reunites her with longtime collaborator and pacesetting gospel producer Thomas Whitfield. This would be Armstrong's last release for the Jive label before being shifted to its gospel sister label Verity Records for 1995's more traditional gospel release The Secret Is Out.

Track listing 
 Something On The Inside (featuring John P. Kee) (4:59)
 Don't You Give Up (6:59)
 Everlasting Love (5:48)
 Ounce Of Your Love (4:39)
 You Can't Take My Faith Away (4:59)
 Thank Ya (4:23)
 Father, I Stretch (5:56)
 Story Of Calvary (5:26)

External links 
 

Vanessa Bell Armstrong albums
1993 albums